George Joseph Barbee (December 12, 1849 – October 30, 1939) was an English-born jockey who was inducted into the National Museum of Racing and Hall of Fame in 1996.  Published reports indicate Barbee lived to be 89, and is buried near Belmont Park in Elmont, New York.

Barbee began his racing career as an apprentice to Tom Jennings, Sr., for whom he exercised the 1865 English Triple Crown winner Gladiateur.

Barbee moved to the United States in 1872 specifically to ride for John Chamberlain. He began his stateside career riding at Monmouth Park Racetrack.

Racing career 
In 1873 Barbee won the inaugural Preakness Stakes aboard Survivor who won by 10 lengths, a record until Smarty Jones 11½ length victory in 2004. He later won two other Preakness Stakes aboard Shirley (1876) and Jacobus (1883).

His record three Preakness victories was not surpassed until Eddie Arcaro won his fourth in 1951.

In addition to the Preakness victories, Barbee won the 1874 Belmont Stakes aboard Saxon, and the 1874 and 1875 Travers Stakes aboard Attila and D'Artagnan, respectively.

Tom Ochiltree was one of Barbee's most important mounts.  He took the colt to victory in the Saratoga, Monmouth, Centennial, Westchester and Baltimore Cups. Other significant horses ridden by Barbee include Springbok, Duke of Magenta, Eole, and Uncas.

Legacy
George Barbee was inducted in the Hall of Fame in 1996, chosen by the Hall of Fame's Historical Review Committee.

Riding career at a glance 

Years Active: 1872–1884, in this country
Number of Mounts: Approximately 500
Number of Winners: 136
Winning Percentage: 27
Stakes Victories: 65

References

“Hall of Fame push on for rider of 1st Preakness winner,” Kent Baker, The Baltimore Sun, May 18, 1995, Pg. 10C.
“Hall of Fame to Induct First Preakness-winning  Jockey,” The Sports Network, May 17, 1996.
“Way Back When,” Frederick N. Rasmussen, The Baltimore Sun, May 17, 2003, p. 2E.

1850 births
1939 deaths
American jockeys
United States Thoroughbred Racing Hall of Fame inductees
Sportspeople from Norfolk
English emigrants to the United States